Bravo! is the second extended play from South Korean boy band UP10TION. It was released on November 27, 2015, by TOP Media. The album consists of six tracks, including the title track, "Catch Me!".

Commercial performance
The EP sold 31,611+ copies in South Korea. It peaked at number 5 on the Korean Gaon Chart.

Track listing

References 

2015 EPs
Korean-language EPs
Kakao M EPs
Up10tion EPs